"The Moonglow Affair" is the 52nd episode of the NBC television series The Man from U.N.C.L.E. This episode served as the pilot for the spin-off series The Girl from U.N.C.L.E.

Plot
While investigating a T.H.R.U.S.H. plot to sabotage space shots, Solo and Illya are incapacitated by a quartzite radiation projector. Waverly assigns new trainee April Dancer, along with agent Mark Slate (who is past the age of retirement for enforcement agents), to find the antidote and destroy the plan. April infiltrates the cosmetics company of T.H.R.U.S.H. agent Arthur Caresse as a model, but she is uncovered by Caresse's sister Jean.

Notes
 The characters of April Dancer and Mark Slate, who are played by Mary Ann Mobley and Norman Fell in this episode, are played by Stefanie Powers and Noel Harrison in The Girl from U.N.C.L.E.
 In the episode, "Moonglow" is the name of a Caresse cosmetic product, a lipstick that glows in the dark.

References

External links
 

1966 American television episodes
The Man from U.N.C.L.E.
Television pilots within series